Hanžeković Memorial is an athletics event at the Sportski Park Mladost athletic stadium in Zagreb, Croatia as part of the IAAF World Challenge Meetings. It was first organized in 1951.

Hanžek (which is the popular name of meeting) was first held  in 1951 as a local level meeting. Seven years later, in 1958, it became an international competition. From 1999 to 2009 the IAAF classified the Hanžeković Memorial among IAAF Grand Prix meetings and it gained IAAF World Challenge meeting status upon the inauguration of that series in 2010.

The meeting got its name in memory of renowned Zagreb runner Boris Hanžeković. Born on 10 November 1916, Hanžeković graduated law in Zagreb, but became known for winning races in different disciplines; he was the junior state champion in 100 and 200 meter races multiple times, in the 110 m hurdles and in both 4 x 100 metres relay and 4 x 400 metres relay. He ran for HŠK Concordia. During World War II in Yugoslavia, Hanžeković refused to run for the Nazi puppet state Independent State of Croatia (NDH). Charged with associating with the Partisans, he was imprisoned in the Jasenovac concentration camp where he was killed in an inmate breakout on 22 April 1945.

Meeting records

Men

Women

References

External links

 
 Hanžeković Memorial records

Annual track and field meetings
Athletics competitions in Croatia
Sports competitions in Zagreb
Recurring sporting events established in 1951
IAAF World Challenge
IAAF Grand Prix
IAAF World Outdoor Meetings
1951 establishments in Croatia